The South Hills is the southern suburbs of Pittsburgh, Pennsylvania.  Two suburban municipalities that are included in the South Hills outside of Pittsburgh are Bethel Park and Mt. Lebanon, as well as the boroughs of Castle Shannon, Dormont, and Green Tree. The South Hills also includes the townships of Baldwin, Collier, Scott, South Park, and Upper St. Clair, plus the boroughs of Baldwin (not to be confused with the previously mentioned township of Baldwin), Brentwood, Bridgeville, Heidelberg, Jefferson Hills, Mount Oliver, Pleasant Hills, West Mifflin, and Whitehall. Much of the South Hills was originally a land grant to John Ormsby.

Transportation
Major roads in this area include Brownsville Road, Pennsylvania Route 51, U.S. Route 19 and Pennsylvania Route 88. The Port Authority of Allegheny County also operates a light rail system that connects the communities in the South Hills with downtown Pittsburgh and the North Shore.

Development 
South Hills High School in Mt. Washington was closed in 1987. In 2007, developers submitted plans to convert the site into apartments marketed towards senior citizens.

References 

Regions of Pennsylvania
Geography of Pittsburgh
Geography of Allegheny County, Pennsylvania